Bruno De Witte (born 1955, in Kortrijk) is a Belgian legal scholar. He is Professor of European Union law at Maastricht University, a co-director of the Maastricht Centre for European Law, and part-time Professor at the Robert Schuman Centre of the European University Institute (EUI) in Florence. He was a full-time Professor of EU Law at the European University Institute from 2000 to 2010, and Professor at Maastricht University from 1989 to 2000.

He graduated in law at the University of Leuven in 1978 and attended the College of Europe in Bruges, Belgium (1978–1979 Paul-Henri Spaak promotion). He obtained a doctorate at the European University Institute in 1985.

References

1955 births
Belgian legal scholars
College of Europe alumni
Academic staff of the European University Institute
European Union law scholars
Academic staff of Maastricht University
People from Kortrijk
Old University of Leuven alumni
Living people